James Kim Ji-seok (김지석, born July 27, 1940) is bishop of the Roman Catholic Diocese of Wonju.

Biography
James Kim Ji-seok was ordained a priest on June 29, 1968.

On November 19, 1990, Pope John Paul II appointed him Coadjutor Bishop of Wonju. He was consecrated bishop on January 14, 1991 by Daniel Tji Hak Soun. Co-consecrators were the Archbishop of Seoul, Cardinal Stephen Kim Sou-hwan, and the Apostolic Nuncio to South Korea, Archbishop Ivan Dias. On March 12, 1993 he succeeded Daniel Tji Hak Soun.

References

South Korean Roman Catholic bishops
1940 births
Living people
Bishops appointed by Pope John Paul II
Roman Catholic bishops of Wonju